This is a list of computer hardware manufacturers in the Soviet Union:

List
Major Soviet hardware manufacturers and ministry affiliations in 1988:

Ministry of the Electronics Industry
Elka Plant
Leningrad Svetlana Association
Exiton Plant in Pavlovskiy Posad (завод «Экситон»)
Voronezh Elektronika Association (НПО «Электроника»)
Zelenograd Complex

Ministry of Instrument Making
V. I. Lenin Kiev Elektronmash Production Association (Киевское производственное объединение «Электронмаш» им. В. И. Ленина)
Kiev Plant of Computers and Electronic Control Machines (VUM) (Киевский завод вычислительных и управляющих машин - ВУМ)
Kishinev Calculating Machine Plant
Kursk Calculating Machines Plant
Leningrad Electrical Machines Plant (Ленинградский Электромашиностроительный Завод)
Livny Experimental Factory of Computer Graphics (Ливенский завод средств машинной графики)
Moscow Elektronmash Scientific Production Association
Orel Computer Machines Plant
Ryazan Order of Lenin Factory of Calculating Analytical Machinery
Impulse Severodonetsk Scientific Production Association (Северодонецкое научно-производственное объединение «Импульс»)
Smolensk Calculating Machine Factory
Taurage Calculating Machine Assemblies Plant (Tauragės skaičiavimo mašinų elementų gamykla)
Tbilisi Control Computer Works
Lenin Vilnius Computer Factory
Vilnius Sigma Association
Vinnytsia Terminal Plant (Завод «Терминал»)

Ministry of Radio Technology
Kazan Computer Plant (Казанский завод ЭВМ)
Minsk Computer Technology Production Corporation (Минское производственное объединение вычислительной техники)
Moscow Calculating Machines Plant (SAM; Московский завод счётно-аналитических машин)
Moscow Radio Plant (Московский Радиозавод)
Penza Computer Work (Завод вычислительных электронных машин)
Yerevan Electronics Plant (Ереванский завод "Электрон")

See also
 List of computer hardware manufacturers

References

 Soviet
Soviet computer hardware
Soviet computer hardware
Soviet computer hardware
Soviet computer hardware
Computer hardware manufacturers
Computer hardware
Computing in the Soviet Union